Mozesh "Mozzi" Gyorio (born August 1, 1989) is a Canadian soccer player.

Early life
His parents were born in Gunaroš in today's Vojvodina, Serbia. His family moved from Yugoslavia to Hungary when he was two years old. Two years later, the family moved to Canada. He speaks English, Hungarian, French, Serbian and Croatian.

Career

Youth and College
Gyorio moved to Canada with his parents when he was a small child, settling in Stratford, Prince Edward Island. He attended Charlottetown Rural High School, played for Sherwood Parkdale Rangers FC and Stratford Foxes FC, and spent time with the youth academy of famed Dutch club NEC Nijmegen in 2007 before returning to North America to continue his education.

He subsequently played two years college soccer at San Jacinto College, where he was a NJCAA All-American honorable mention, was selected to the NJCAA all-region team and NSCAA all-region 2nd team, and was the college's offensive MVP in his senior year. He also spent time with Major League Soccer side Houston Dynamo's academy, and played for the team in the Dallas Cup in 2009.

During his college years Gyorio also played with the Canadian amateur side Avondale Islanders in the Nova Scotia Soccer League.

Professional
Gyorio signed his first professional contract in 2010 when he was signed by FC Tampa Bay Rowdies in the USSF Division 2 Professional League. He made his professional debut on May 1, 2010, as a substitute for Takuya Yamada in a game against Miami FC, and scored his first professional goals on October 1, 2010 in a 6–3 victory over Crystal Palace Baltimore. On November 30, 2010, Tampa Bay announced that it would exercise its contract option on Gyorio for the 2011 season.

Tampa Bay announced on December 27, 2011 that it would decline the 2012 contract option on Gyorio. In February 2012, he has joined an MLS side Sporting Kansas City as a trialist in their pre-season training camp for 2012 Major League Soccer season.

On January 1, 2013 Gyorio signed a 6-month deal with English League Two side Fleetwood Town. He made his European debut on February 12 against Oxford United at Kassam Stadium coming on as a substitute for David Ball. It was announced on the 7th of May 2013, that Fleetwood would not be offering the midfielder a new contract, and would therefore be released.

On February 2, 2016 Gyorio made his return to Canada, signing with Ottawa Fury FC. In December 2016, the Fury announced that Gyorio would not return to the team as the club moved to USL in 2017.

In September 2017, Gyorio signed with Italian Eccellenza club U.S.D. Pistunina (an amateur team in the city Messina, Sicily), but he played few games with the team between international transfer papers and in the middle of November he left to go back in Canada for family reasons.

International career
Gyorio represented Canada at the 2009 Francophone Games in Lebanon and was a member of the Canadian national U-20 pool.

References

1987 births
Living people
Association football midfielders
Canadian soccer players
Soccer people from Prince Edward Island
People from Bačka Topola
People from Queens County, Prince Edward Island
Hungarians in Vojvodina
Yugoslav emigrants to Canada
Yugoslav people of Hungarian descent
Canadian people of Hungarian descent
Naturalized citizens of Canada
Canadian expatriate soccer players
Expatriate footballers in the Netherlands
Canadian expatriate sportspeople in the Netherlands
Expatriate soccer players in the United States
Canadian expatriate sportspeople in the United States
Expatriate footballers in England
Canadian expatriate sportspeople in England
Expatriate footballers in Italy
Canadian expatriate sportspeople in Italy
NEC Nijmegen players
San Jacinto College alumni
Houston Dynamo FC players
Tampa Bay Rowdies players
Fleetwood Town F.C. players
Minnesota United FC (2010–2016) players
Austin Aztex players
Ottawa Fury FC players
USSF Division 2 Professional League players
North American Soccer League players
English Football League players
USL Championship players
Eccellenza players
Canada men's youth international soccer players